Hawkshaw is a community in the Canadian province of New Brunswick located on the Saint John River. It is situated in Dumfries, a parish of York County. Much of this community was submerged by water when the Mactaquac Dam was built in 1967.  Prior to construction, many of the buildings were moved and others were burned.  The town of Nackawic was built nearby to house the displaced residents.

History

See also
List of communities in New Brunswick
The Town That Drowned

References

Communities in York County, New Brunswick